Stock and station agencies are businesses which provide a support service to the agricultural community. Their staff who deal with clients are known as stock and station agents. They advise and represent farmers and graziers in business transactions that involve livestock, wool, fertiliser, rural property and equipment and merchandise on behalf of their clients. The number and importance of these businesses fell in the late 20th century.

These rural business services institutions originated, when communications were slow and often very difficult, to cope with the double remoteness of early Australian and New Zealand primary producers from their nearest settlement and, particularly in the case of wool, from their overseas markets. In practice, they were the pastoralist's banker. Similar and sometimes the same organisations operated in Latin America and the Midwestern United States, which had extensive pastoral farming.

Industry
 Stock refers to livestock, its purchase and sale.
 Station refers to a facility equipped with special equipment and personnel for a particular purpose—in this case in Australasia—for pastoral industry, see  Australia: Stations and New Zealand: Stations. The same word was used for a defensible residence constructed on the American frontier during the early nineteenth century.
 They operate as the agent of their client, on behalf of the particular pastoralist or farmer.

Company
These businesses grew to provide their clients with every product or service they might want right from employees or seasonal  working capital to, in the person of a client's personal stock agent, close personal friend and personal confidant who regularly visited them, maintained the client's loyalty and kept them up to date with events in the community and their industry. His branch manager might often be unable to maintain an easy relationship with clients unable to fulfill their financial obligations. The branch manager's knowledge of his client's business activities was such and his control over the client's spending was such he could ration their spending on sugar and flour.

They also act as local managers of properties on behalf of absentee owners deceased estates and mortgagees technically in possession of properties.

They provide retail stores in small towns for agricultural requirements selling, for example, animal health supplies, animal feed, fencing materials, fertilizer, machinery and tools, and even clothing and groceries.

Stock sales
An important activity is to organise regular local livestock sales at a community's commercial saleyards. Small rural communities may hold a single annual sale at local saleyards and this may be the highlight of their autumn business and social calendar.

Staff in the field

A vital and well-liked part of their rural community, in remote areas, stock agents perform a variety of commercial and social functions. They bring to outlying homesteads on farms and stations stores, mail and newspapers, local news and gossip.

Next the stock agent turns to real work and: 
reports to his client on market trends and prices; 
sorts stock into lines for sales; 
sorts prime animals for the freezing works; 
values livestock and advises on different marketing options for stock; 
arranges penning and auction; 
arranges private sales between sellers and buyers.
arranges transport of stock to saleyards; 
conducts sales of wool on behalf of clients on a commission basis; 
sells a wide range of agricultural products including chemicals; 
arranges clearing sales of surplus machinery plant and equipment; and 
arranges insurance.

He also advises and assists clients in the management of agricultural or pastoral companies, stock or farming problems; 
arranges finance for the buying of livestock or property; and 
brings prospective buyers to inspect properties for sale.

Specialisations
Individual stock agents, within the same agency, may specialise in any one of the preceding activities.

"Arranged marriage: Farmers expect their stock agents to perform a range of tasks and services. One agent even acted as a go-between for a client who wanted to get married but was too shy to propose to the woman!"

The close and enduring individual client relationships which are formed are seen as a forerunner of the newer concept of relationship marketing.

In his history of the industry Simon Ville says: ". . . the stock and station agent has been a legendary figure in local folklore, connected or related to many individuals and groups, a central figure embedded in rural settler communities and about whom everyone has had a view. This social perspective helps inform our understanding of the agent's role and importance in economic activities since trust, reputation, and personal connection were the vital lubricants in sustaining business relationships and networks."

Some notable examples
Some of these businesses grew very large in the 19th and early 20th centuries.
 The Australian Estates Company Limited
 Dalgety plc (Frederick Dalgety)
 Elder Smith & Co Limited
 Goldsbrough Mort
 Permewan Wright & Co. Ltd.
 Wright Stephenson & Co Limited
 National Mortgage and Agency Company of New Zealand
 New Zealand Loan and Mercantile Agency Company
Donald Reid Otago Farmers

Notes

References

Further reading
 Simon P. Ville The rural entrepreneurs: a history of the stock and station agent, 2000, Cambridge University Press
 Ken Emms, Alan Squires Stock & Station Agents' Handbook 1995, Butterworth Heinemann

Agriculture in Australia

Real estate companies of Australia
Agriculture in New Zealand
Agricultural occupations
Economic occupations
Livestock in Australia